is a Japanese manga series written and illustrated by Rumiko Takahashi. It consists of nine stories told in 16 chapters irregularly published in Shogakukan's Shōnen Sunday Zōkan and Weekly Shōnen Sunday from 1984 to 1994.

Two of the stories from the series, Mermaid's Forest and Mermaid's Scar, were adapted as original video animations (OVAs) in 1991 and 1993, respectively. All of the tales, except one, were later adapted as an anime television series in 2003. In North America, the manga has been licensed by Viz Media, while the first OVA was released by US Manga Corps in 1993 and the second OVA by Viz Media in 1995. The anime television series was licensed by Geneon Entertainment.

In 1989, Mermaid Saga received the 20th Seiun Award for the Best Comic.

Plot
According to an ancient Japanese legend, mermaid flesh may grant immortality if eaten. However, there is a much greater chance that consumption will lead to death or transformation into a damned creature known as a Lost Soul (Deformed Ones in the English dub). Mermaid Saga tells the tale of Yuta, an immortal young man who has been alive for five hundred years after eating mermaid flesh. However, over the years he is grown tired of his immortality and throughout the series, he wanders across Japan searching for a mermaid who may be able to turn him back into a normal human being. He encounters Mana, a young woman who is about to be sacrificed. She has been forced to eat mermaid flesh so that after she is killed, her flesh can be used to rejuvenate a village of ageing immortal women. Yuta rescues her and they travel on together while Yuta pursues his quest to become human again.

Characters
Note:In some cases a character is portrayed by a different voice actor in the OVAs. These voice actors are also added.

Main characters

A 500-year-old immortal, born in 1480. Yuta and his fellow fishermen ate the flesh of a mermaid to attain immortality when they captured one, but only Yuta survived while his comrades were either poisoned or turned into Deformed Ones. He married and lived normally until he discovered that while his wife grew older, he did not age physically from the day he ate the flesh. He hears that a mermaid could help him to become normal again, so he begins an endless search for a mermaid. During his travels, he encounters a lovely fifteen-year-old girl named Mana in a village of mermaids. They made her an immortal and were planning to devour her to rejuvenate themselves, but Yuta rescues her and she joins him as a traveling companion. Kind-hearted and helpful, Yuta befriends many people who have had contact with mermaid's flesh over his 500 years existence.

An immortal and Yuta's companion. She was raised by a group of old mermaids who kept her captive and incapacitated in a hut. Born in 1965, once she reached adolescence at 15 years of age, in 1980, they made her an immortal and planned to eat her flesh in order to regain their youth. She is rescued by Yuta and then travels with him. She is very loyal to Yuta and rescues him a number of times. She has feelings for him, but due to her somewhat naïve nature, she does not seem to understand her own emotions.

Other characters

A young boy who has been immortal for 800 years. He has a childlike appearance but centuries of loneliness turned him into a cruel and heartless monster. His first victim was his original mother to whom he fed mermaid flesh, but she became a Lost Soul. After 100 years of being adopted by various people and losing them to famine, disease, and war, the boy decides to feed small amounts of mermaid flesh to random people, and have them pose as his parent until they succumb to the adverse effects of the flesh or serve their purpose. He acquired a Nambu pistol during World War II, which he used in his fight with Yuta who had discovered his true nature. His latest mother Misa, gave him the name Masato. He met her during World War II after she lost her son in an air-raid. When Yuta and Mana came across Misa and Masato, Misa was losing her regenerative powers so Masato planned to make his nanny Yukie his new mother. However, she turned into a Lost Soul. He tried to kill Yuta and Mana but failed and got in a car crash when he tried to escape them. His corpse was never found.

She lost her husband and child during World War II and was found by the young boy Masato who fed her mermaid flesh so that she could become his long-lived surrogate mother. After 80 years, she become weary of his manipulation and escaped but he found her and forced her to continue to act as his mother figure. As the mermaid flesh's effect began to wear off, Masato began to look for another surrogate. She died after being attacked by a Lost Soul which was formerly Masato's nanny, Yukie.

She is Masato's loving and caring nanny which made her an excellent choice to become Masato's new surrogate mother. Yukie was unaware of Masato's immortality. Masato gave her a piece mermaid's flesh make her an immortal, but instead she was transformed into a monstrous Lost Soul and was killed by Yuta. He was acting to protect Masato and his mother Misa from what he saw as a monster.

She was the teenage eldest daughter of Toba Island's leader of a band of pirates. Due to her father becoming ill, Rin became the leader. She was searching for a mermaid to cure her father many years ago and met Yuta when he came back to life after dying in a sea battle. They fell in love and Yuta promised to stay in Toba Island if he could turn back into a mortal. However, Yuta decided to leave Toba Island because he did not want to marry another mortal girl while he was immortal. Rin continued as the leader of Toba Island's pirates.

A wife of the Sakagami Island headman. Isago told her husband of the immortality of the mermaid's flesh and encouraged him to find one. Isago is pregnant from her former husband who was murdered by the Sakagami pirates three years earlier. In order to give birth to a healthy child, Isago needs to eat the mermaid flesh, because she is in fact a mermaid. She tells Rin that there are mermaids who can walk on land and mermaids who swim at sea. The ones who walk on land eat the swimming mermaids' flesh, especially during pregnancy. Isago finally ate mermaid flesh, dived into the ocean, transformed back into a mermaid, and gave birth to two healthy merbabies.

She suffered from a deadly illness when she was a young girl. Her identical twin sister Sawa fed her the blood of a mermaid which cured her illness, but caused her arm to become deformed and turned her hair white. Because of her deformity, Towa was locked in a cell beneath the house. Her deformed arm caused her terrible pain, so she asked her fiancée Dr. Shiina to cut the arms off dead girls and re-attach them to her. But after a few years each arm became deformed and the pain came back. After their father died, Towa was released from her cell and tried to make Sawa eat mermaid flesh in revenge for her pitiful life, but Sawa suddenly died of a heart attack. Robbed of her revenge, Towa joins her twin in death, instructing the others to burn Mermaid Hill and everything associated with it.

She was Towa's identical twin sister who inherited the family line and was placed in charge of guarding Mermaid Hill, a hidden repository of mermaid flesh. When Towa was dying, she fed her the blood of a mermaid which deformed her arm and resulted in her confinement. Sawa married and gave birth to a child, but her husband died fighting in World War II and her child and father died sometime later. Sawa reluctantly reveals the location of Mermaid Hill after Towa threatens to kill Mana. Towa tried to force Sawa to eat mermaid's flesh, but she suddenly died of a cardiac arrest.

Towa Kannagi's fiancé. Shiina begged Towa many times to leave with him but she always refused. Shiina agreed to cut the arms off dead girls and replace Towa's deformed arm. Shiina recounts to Yuta and Mana his history with Towa and how she was obsessed with by her "other self", Sawa. In the OVA, after Towa ran into the burning Mermaid Hill to end her life of revenge, Shiina chased after her to join her in death, making up for fifty-five years of lost time.

He was once a mortal, but he ate the flesh of a mermaid corpse he found lying on the beach hoping that he would gain immortality. When he awoke, he saw that his village had been destroyed and everyone - including his family - had been murdered, not realizing that he had killed them himself. The flesh had partially transformed him into a Lost Soul as he could speak and had human feelings. The transformation had caused his eyes to swell so he was called "Big Eyes". Mana is sympathetic to his situation and tries to protect him, but Yuta and a local hunter have no choice but to kill him because of his murderous ways.

She died as a young girl during the Warring States period. A Buddhist monk found her father mourning the loss of his only daughter and used an ancient art called "Hangon" to resurrect Natsume who became immortal. Many decades later, Yuta met Natsume and the monk who was pursuing her. The monk had used mermaid's liver in the process which caused her to eat the livers of animals and sometimes humans, so he decided to kill her. Natsume befriended Yuta and asked if she could travel with him, but her possessive father became angry and tried to kill Yuta. While Natsume's father was dealing with Yuta, the monk was able to rip out her liver. Natsume saved Yuta from being killed, but her father jumped off a cliff with her in his arms. He died immediately, but Natsume was able to live long enough to say good-bye to Yuta before she turned back into bones.

He is a young boy whom Yuta and Mana find terribly injured after he escaped from a moving car while being kidnapped. However, he quickly recovers after he swallows his mother's medicine. Yuta and Mana take Nanao home to his mother and grandmother who is behaving strangely. Yuta and Mana discover that Nanao's "mother" is actually Nanao's grandmother who became an immortal 25 years ago and after her son grew up, she kidnapped his son and raised him as her own. She tried to feed him mermaid flesh but Yuta stopped her.

She became an immortal in 1969 after her husband left with their son Nanao, due to her mental instability. She ate mermaid flesh and became immortal, but her face became scarred and gave her eternal pain. Years later, her son had grown, married and he had a baby son. She kidnapped the baby, also naming him Nanao and raised him as her own son. One day, she saw a woman's body lying on the beach and removed her face which she kept in a box. She switched it with her own face when she appeared in public to hide her disfiguring scar. She planned to feed mermaid flesh to her grandson Nanao to also make him immortal, but Yuta stopped her. She ran away in distress and her body was found later in a burned-out storehouse.

She met Yuta some years before World War II. When Nae learned about Yuta's curse of immortality, she told him a secret about some mermaid's ashes, brought to the local village by a nun long ago. Nae spread some ashes around the field of red flowers, causing them to bloom all year long and she called it "red valley". She and Yuta fell in love and began secretly meeting in the red valley. Her fiancée Eijiro, became jealous and murdered her. He planned to use the mermaid ashes to bring her back to life but could not find them. He eventually found the ashes and used them to bring her back to life, but she became a shadow of her former self with no memory of her past. Many years later, Yuta returned to the village with Mana, which caused Nae to remember remnants of her past. However, Eijiro fatally stabs Nae with his cane sword and slowly the effect of the ashes on Nae wears off, leaving her to die once again in the red valley.

Before World War II, Eijiro was a young, bright man who fell in love with and was betrothed to Nae Kogure who was from a wealthy family. When Yuta arrived, Nae fell in love with him and Eijiro became insanely jealous. He killed Nae when he believed she was planning to leave with Yuta. For most of his life he searched for the location of some mermaid's ashes to revive her and eventually does so, but Nae has no memory of her past. Many years later, Yuta returns to the village and finds Nae as young and beautiful as ever. Eijiro is still consumed by jealousy and fatally stabs Nae when she starts to remember Yuta and the past.

A long time ago, Soukichi was an errand boy from Nae's family. Many years later after Nae's disappearance, as an old man, he helps Yuta and Mana, believing that Eijiro kidnapped her.

Akiko is a sweet girl and the sister of the violent Shingo Kiryu. When they were young she tried to stop Shingo killing small animals with his knife, but she accidentally hit him in the face with his knife and caused him to lose an eye. Eventually Akiko decided to poison Shingo and herself. The poison she used was the flesh of a mermaid which caused Akiko to continue living in an almost comatose state, sitting at home in a chair like a life-sized doll. However, Shingo became immortal and ripped out her eye in revenge. After a battle with Shingo, Yuta decapitated Akiko, thus ending her existence as a lifeless doll.

Shingo is the insane and violent brother of Akiko Kiryu. They lived together in the Kiryu Manor shortly before the Russo-Japanese War. Yuta worked there temporarily and witnessed Shingo's cruel and sadistic behavior. Akiko tried to poison him with the flesh of a mermaid, but although he appeared to die, he became an immortal. His father tried to kill him again, but that failed as well. Because of Shingo's insanity, he was kept in a cell in the basement of the Kiryu home. Once he was released, he ripped out one of Akiko's eyes. Now, every time he murders someone he sees the last thing that she saw, his own twisted face reaching down to rip her eye out. He believes that killing his sister will make the visions stop, but after a battle with Yuta, Yuta decapitated Akiko. Yuta attempted to do the same with Shingo, but Shingo suffered another vision, realizing he would forever be tormented by his sister's last sight, and he took Yuta's sword and decapitated himself.

Ayu is a girl in the mermaid village who took care of Mana. Ayu was next to sacrifice herself. Ayu is a mermaid, but died after spears pierced her body. Yuta found her body and showed it to the old women.

The flesh of mermaids is reported to give eternal youth, regenerative self-healing properties, and longevity. It is also a poison which can cause death, deformity or cause the person to become a Lost Soul or monster. Mermaids mostly live beneath the sea and have a normal lifespan. However, some live on land and are immortal, but they must sometimes eat the flesh of an immortal human to rejuvenate themselves.

Media

Manga
The stories of Mermaid Saga, written and illustrated by Rumiko Takahashi, were irregularly serialized in Shogakukan's Shōnen Sunday Zōkan and Weekly Shōnen Sunday from August 1984 to February 1994. In total there are nine stories told in 16 chapters. The first wide-ban volume released by Shogakukan was Mermaid's Forest, named after the third story within it and published on April 25, 1988. The second wide-ban, Mermaid's Scar, was released on December 19, 1992, without two stories (four chapters): "Eye of the Demon" and "The Last Face". These stories were not yet released when the book came out. The series was re-released in shinsōban format in 2003, in three volumes with all the stories.

In North America, Mermaid Forest began serialization by Viz Media in Animerica'''s first issue in November 1992. Rachel Matt Thorn provided the translation. It was published in the first nine issues, and then the rest was published in the comic book format from December 1993 to September 1995. The manga was later released in three graphic novel volumes, Mermaid Forest, Mermaid's Scar and Mermaid's Gaze, from November 1, 1994 to March 8, 1997. In 2004, it was released in four books, simply titled Mermaid Saga, from July 14 to December 22, 2004. In February 2020, Viz Media announced a 2-volume new edition of the manga, Mermaid Saga Collector's Edition. The first volume was published on November 17, 2020, and the second was published on February 16, 2021.

Volume list
First Japanese edition

First English edition/Second Japanese edition

Second English edition

Third English edition

Anime
Original video animations
The first original video animation (OVA), Mermaid Forest, by studio Pastel, was released in Japan in August 1991. A subtitled Laserdisc and VHS tape were released in North America by US Manga Corps on March 3, 1993. It was marketed as one of the Rumic World anime (along with Maris the Chojo, Fire Tripper, and Laughing Target).

The second OVA, Mermaid's Scar, made by Madhouse, was released in Japan on VHS and Laserdisc on September 24, 1993. Viz Media published a dubbed release on VHS on November 21, 1995.

Anime television series
In 2003, the animation company Tokyo Movie Shinsha produced a 13-episode TV series based on Mermaid Saga as part of the Rumic Theater series and it was broadcast on TV Tokyo from October 4 to December 20, 2003. All but Mermaid's Gaze were animated. While closely following the story of the original manga (more so than the OVA versions), many of the violent aspects of the stories were toned down. Only eleven episodes were shown on Japanese TV, with the final two episodes (Mermaid's Scar) released direct to video, allegedly because this particular story was too violent for TV. It was released in North America by Geneon.

Episode list

ReceptionMermaid Saga'' was awarded the 20th Seiun Award for the Best Comic category in 1989.

See also
Mermaids in popular culture

Notes

References

External links
 Mermaid's Flesh at Rumic World Features summaries, characters descriptions, pictures galleries, and more.
 

1984 manga
1991 anime OVAs
1993 anime OVAs
2003 anime television series debuts
Cannibalism in fiction
Dark fantasy anime and manga
Fiction about immortality
Fictional mermen and mermaids
Geneon USA
Manga anthologies
Romance anime and manga
Rumic World
Shogakukan franchises
Shogakukan manga
Shōnen manga
Supernatural anime and manga
TMS Entertainment
TV Tokyo original programming
Viz Media manga
Works by Rumiko Takahashi